La Romana is the top female volleyball team of La Romana.

History
The team was founded in 2007.

Current volleyball squad
As of December 2008

Coach:  Mamerto Fernández

Assistant coach:  Aramis Arredondo

Palmares

National competition 
National league

2007 - 2nd Place

References
League Official website

Dominican Republic volleyball clubs
Volleyball clubs established in 2007